Leon's Frozen Custard is a classic family-owned drive-in, specializing in frozen custard, located in Milwaukee, Wisconsin. Opened in 1942, its current appearance as a "drive-in restaurant" comes from an early 1950s remodel. It is considered a landmark in the city of Milwaukee.

Leon's Frozen Custard claims to be the "Home of the World's Finest Frozen Custard," as noted boldly on its signage. Leon's offers the three "regular" flavors of vanilla and chocolate and butter pecan. Butter pecan was added on a regular basis because it was so popular. On weekends, Leon's adds a fourth flavor.

See also
 List of frozen custard companies

References

External links
Leon's website

Ice cream parlors in the United States
Restaurants in Milwaukee
Buildings and structures in Milwaukee
Culture of Milwaukee
Tourist attractions in Milwaukee
Restaurants established in 1942
Frozen custard
1942 establishments in Wisconsin